Carmen Possum is a popular 80-line macaronic poem written in a mix of Latin and English.  Its author is unknown, but the poem's theme and language enable one to surmise that he or she was from the United States of America and was either a teacher or at least a student of Latin.

The title is a multilingual pun: it could be taken to mean "I Can Sing" in Latin, but, as revealed in the text, it is supposed to mean "Song of the Opossum".  However, both interpretations violate Latin grammar.

The poem can be used as a pedagogical device for elementary Latin teaching. The language mix includes vocabulary, morphology (turnus) and grammar (trunkum longum).

Carmen Possum is also an unpublished musical piece by Normand Lockwood.

Publication history

An early version of the poem, with different words, a couple extra lines, and divided into four sections and titled Tale of a 'Possum, appeared in a Michigan University publication dated 1867, where it is attributed to Wheaton College. That same version later appeared in an 1886 issue of the University of Virginia magazine Virginia Spectator, with the title The Tale of a 'Possum; the editors inquired of readers as to the poem's authorship.

A version closer to the modern version, attributed to a "Prof. W. W. Legare" of northern Georgia and dated to the 1850s, was featured in a 1914 periodical.

The poem (modern version) 
Carmen Possum
 
The nox was lit by lux of Luna,
And 'twas a nox most opportuna
For nix was scattered o'er this mundus,
A shallow nix, et non profundus.
On sic a nox with canis unus,
Two boys went out to hunt for coonus.
The corpus of this bonus canis
Was full as long as octo span is,
But brevior legs had canis never
Quam had hic dog; et bonus clever.
Some used to say, in stultum jocum
Quod a field was too small locum
For sic a dog to make a turnus
Circum self from stem to sternus.
Unus canis, duo puer,
Nunquam braver, nunquam truer,
Quam hoc trio nunquam fuit,
If there was I never knew it.
This bonus dog had one bad habit,
Amabat much to tree a rabbit,
Amabat plus to chase a rattus,
Amabat bene tree a cattus.
But on this nixy moonlight night
This old canis did just right.
Nunquam treed a starving rattus,
Nunquam chased a starving cattus,
But sucurrit on, intentus
On the track and on the scentus,
Till he trees a possum strongum,
In a hollow trunkum longum.
Loud he barked in horrid bellum,
Seemed on terra vehit pellum. 
Quickly ran the duo puer
Mors of possum to secure.
Quam venerit, one began
To chop away like quisque man.
Soon the axe went through the truncum
Soon he hit it all kerchunkum;
Combat deepens, on ye braves! 
Canis, pueri et staves
As his powers non longius carry,
Possum potest non pugnare.
On the nix his corpus lieth.
Down to Hades spirit flieth,
Joyful pueri, canis bonus,
Think him dead as any stonus.
Now they seek their pater's domo,
Feeling proud as any homo,
Knowing, certe, they will blossom
Into heroes, when with possum
They arrive, narrabunt story,
Plenus blood et plenior glory.
Pompey, David, Samson, Caesar,
Cyrus, Black Hawk, Shalmanezer!
Tell me where est now the gloria,
Where the honors of victoria?
Nunc a domum narrent story,
Plenus sanguine, tragic, gory.
Pater praiseth, likewise mater,
Wonders greatly younger frater.
Possum leave they on the mundus,
Go themselves to sleep profundus,
Somniunt possums slain in battle,
Strong as ursae, large as cattle.
When nox gives way to lux of morning,
Albam terram much adorning,
Up they jump to see the varmin,
Of the which this is the carmen.
Lo! possum est resurrectum!
Ecce pueri dejectum,
Ne relinquit back behind him,
Et the pueri never find him.
Cruel possum! bestia vilest,
How the pueros thou beguilest!
Pueri think non plus of Caesar,
Go ad Orcum, Shalmanezer,
Take your laurels, cum the honor,
Since ista possum is a goner!

Summary translation
The poem chronicles the adventures of two boys who go out hunting for an opossum or raccoon on a snowy night, with their Dachshund dog.  Although the dog was often mocked for its disproportionate length ("eight spans", or seventy inches) and love of chasing rabbits, cats, and rats, it performs flawlessly on the night, chasing an opossum into a long, hollow log.

The boys run quickly to secure their prey, chopping away at the log to get hold of it.  They go back home, leaving the dead opossum on the ground.  They proudly tell the story, which is said by the author to dwarf the feats of Pompey, Samson, Julius Caesar, Cyrus the Great, and other great military leaders of antiquity, as well as of American Indian chief Black Hawk; winning the praise of their parents and admiration of their younger brother. They go to sleep, dreaming of opossums as strong as bears and as large as cattle.  Early the next morning, the two boys go to see their catch, but cannot find it. The "vile possum" had tricked them by playing dead -- as opossums do when threatened and cornered. The kids never find the opossum again, and feel dejected.

Analysis

Title
While carmen possum may sound like a Latin phrase, it is grammatically incorrect.  The closest interpretation, satisfying (if only barely) the requirements of syntax, would be "I am capable of song" (with "of" here constituting not a stand-alone preposition but rather a portion of an English phrasal verb).

However, as the text reveals ("Up they jump to see the varmin / Of the which this is the carmen"), the title itself is a macaronic mix of Latin and English, and should be understood as "Song of [the] Opossum".  Yet, the noun "possum", if it were a Latin word, should be in the genitive case (possi) rather than the nominative (possum).  Although one could assume that possum is an indeclinable noun.

Poem structure
The poem is written from a third-person omniscient perspective in a rhyming mix of  trochaic tetrameter and iambic tetrameter, with turns of phrase satirising Homerian epic.

See also
The Talents (ca. 1460), a play containing a macaronic Middle English/Latin text.
The Motor Bus (1914), a macaronic English/Latin poem by Alfred Denis Godley.
Dog Latin

References

External links 
 text of poem (with typos).
 Guide to Normand Lockwood collection at AMRC, UCB.

American poems
Macaronic language
Latin language